Pandiyan Ukkira Peruvaludhi (Tamil: பாண்டியன் உக்கிரப் பெருவழுதியார்) was a king and poet belonging to the Sangam period, to whom 3 verses of the Sangam literature have been attributed, including verse 4 of the Tiruvalluva Maalai. He was also the chancellor of the Third Sangam.

Biography
Ukkira Peruvaludhi was a ruler of the Pandyan dynasty and a patron of the late Sangam. He defeated Vengaimarbhan, the king of Gaanapereyil or Kaalaiyar Koil, and hence came to be known as "Pandiyan Gaanapereyil Thandha Ukkira Peruvaludhi". He was the ally of the Chera King Mavenko and Rajasooyam Vetta Perunar Killi. The Sangam work of Agananuru is believed to have compiled in his court. He was also the chancellor of the third academy in Madura, known as the Third Sangam.

Contribution to the Sangam literature
Ukkira Peruvaludhi has written 3 verses, including 1 in Natrinai (verse 98), 1 in Agananuru (verse 26), and 1 in Tiruvalluva Maalai (verse 4).

Views on Valluvar and the Kural
Ukkira Peruvaludhi opines about Valluvar and the Kural text thus:

See also

 Sangam literature
 List of Sangam poets
 Tiruvalluva Maalai

Notes

References

 
 
 
 

Tamil philosophy
Tamil poets
Sangam poets
Tiruvalluva Maalai contributors
Pandyan kings